Thasra railway station is a railway station on the Western Railway network in the state of Gujarat, India.

References

See also
 Kheda district

Railway stations in Kheda district
Vadodara railway division